This page describes the rosters for the 2011 World Junior Ice Hockey Championships.

Top Division

Group A

Head coach:  Keith Allain

Head coach:  Richard Jost

Head coach:  Lauri Marjamäki

Head coach:  Štefan Mikeš

Head coach:  Ernst Höfner

Group B

Head coach:  Dave Cameron

Head coach:  Roger Rönnberg

Head coach:  Valeri Bragin

Head coach:  Miroslav Prerost

Head coach:  Geir Hoff

References

External links
IIHF.com

Rosters
World Junior Ice Hockey Championships rosters